Voy a Acabar Borracho is the mainstream debut album by Spanish rock band Platero y Tú. It was produced by Platero y Tú, recorded from 22 to 24 February 1991 and published by Wellcome Records on June 1991. On 26 August 1996, DRO republished the album.

The outro of the song "Si tú te vas" is taken from Status Quo's version of the song Rockin' All Over the World.

Track listing

Personnel 
 Fito Cabrales: Vocals and guitar.
 Iñaki "Uoho" Antón: Guitar.
 Juantxu Olano: Bass.
 Jesús García: Drums.

References

External links 
 Platero y Tú official website (in Spanish)

1991 albums
Platero y Tú albums
Spanish-language albums